Zayn al-Din Omar Savaji was a Persian philosopher and logician.

Life
He was born in Saveh (modern Arak province in Iran) in the early 12th century. After serving as a judge in his native city, he went to pursue scholarly interests in Neyshapur. He earned his living by being a copyist of manuscripts, primarily of philosophical texts.

Work and influence
Five of his works have been published, three are still in manuscript form and the rest are unknown or possible misattributions.  His works on logic, in which he made innovative proposals for the use of Persian in place of Arabic terms, were especially influential.  He among the few Muslim philosophers who quested the Aristotelian method.  He proposed a revisions in the order of the subject matter in Organon.  He is cited frequently in the later Iranian philosophical tradition, though he has remained almost unknown to Western historians of philosophy and logic.

Notes

12th-century Iranian philosophers
Islamic philosophers
12th-century Muslim scholars of Islam
People from Markazi Province